Raphaël Poirée (born 9 August 1974) is a retired French biathlete who was active from 1995 to 2007. With his 44 World Cup victories and several World Championship medals he ranks among the most successful biathletes ever.

Sports career 
Poirée was born in Rives, Isère in France and like the rest of his colleagues in the French biathlon and cross-country skiing team, was a sport soldier.

Poirée has four IBU World Cup titles (1999−00, 2000−01, 2001−02 and 2003−04). He has also come second once, in 2005−06 and third once, in the 2004−05 season. Poirée has had 103 World Cup podium finishes, 44 in first place, 39 in second, and has come third 20 times. In the Winter Olympics, Poiree has one silver and two bronze medals. At the World Championships however, he has seven gold medals, three silver and seven bronze.

Raphaël Poirée was one of the best mass start biathletes of his time, with 9 1st places, 4 2nd places, and 3 3rd places in his World Cup career, second only to Ole Einar Bjørndalen who got 10 1st places, 5 2nd places and 4 3rd places in the same time frame. Poirée also won 4 out of the 7 World Championship mass start races he took part in.

Poirée also had five victories at the Holmenkollen ski festival biathlon competition with three mass starts (2000, 2002, and 2004), one pursuit (2004) and one individual (2007).

After winning the gold medal at the World Championships in Antholz in 2007, Poiree announced the end of his career after that World Cup season. He eventually chose to retire after the Holmenkollen World Cup meet (i.e. before the season's last WC meet, in Khanty-Mansyisk in Russia the week after); his last competition was the Mass start race on Sunday 11 March, where he finished in second place after a cm-close last sprint to the finish line against his long-time competitor Ole Einar Bjørndalen of Norway.

Personal life
He  married Norwegian biathlete Liv Grete Skjelbreid Poirée on 27 May 2000 in Norway. They first met at the 1992 Junior World Championships and began dating in 1996. They have three daughters together, Emma (born 27 January 2003), Anna (born 10 January 2007) and Lena (born 10 October 2008). They have a flat in La Chapelle-en-Vercors, France, but live mostly in Liv Grete's home village of Hålandsdal, Norway. The Poirées are the only husband and wife to win medals in the same Olympics for different nations. At the 2002 Winter Olympics, France’s Raphaël and Norway’s Liv won matching silver medals in the biathlon. In July 2013, the couple announced that they were separating.

In 2009, Poirée was involved in a quad-bike accident which nearly left him paralysed.  One month after undergoing neck and back surgery he was released from hospital.

He speaks French, English, Norwegian and Italian

Biathlon results
All results are sourced from the International Biathlon Union.

Olympic Games
3 medals (1 silver, 2 bronze)

*Pursuit was added as an event in 2002, with mass start being added in 2006.

World Championships
18 medals (8 gold, 3 silver, 7 bronze)

*During Olympic seasons competitions are only held for those events not included in the Olympic program.
**Team was removed as an event in 1998, and pursuit was added in 1997 with mass start being added in 1999 and the mixed relay in 2005.

World Cup

*Pursuit was added as an event in the 1996–97 season, and mass start was added in the 1998–99 season.

Individual victories
44 victories (7 In, 13 Sp, 15 Pu, 9 MS)

*Results are from UIPMB and IBU races which include the Biathlon World Cup, Biathlon World Championships and the Winter Olympic Games.

See also
List of Olympic medalist families

References

External links 
 
 
 "Adieu Raphael Poiree!" – Article from biathlonworld.com 11 March 2007
 Fansite of Raphael and Liv Grete Poirée
 Fansite about Poirée and other French biathletes 
 Holmenkollen biathlon information

1974 births
Living people
Sportspeople from Isère
French male biathletes
French male cross-country skiers
Biathletes at the 1998 Winter Olympics
Biathletes at the 2002 Winter Olympics
Biathletes at the 2006 Winter Olympics
Olympic biathletes of France
Medalists at the 2002 Winter Olympics
Medalists at the 2006 Winter Olympics
Olympic medalists in biathlon
Olympic bronze medalists for France
Olympic silver medalists for France
Biathlon World Championships medalists
Holmenkollen Ski Festival winners